Kings North is a provincial electoral district in Nova Scotia, Canada, that elects one member of the Nova Scotia House of Assembly.

The electoral district was formed through redistribution in 1956.  It was previously part of the district of Kings.

District profile

Agriculture is a major industry in Kings North. The district has many geographical features of note, including Cape Blomidon, Cape Split, and the Minas Basin.  Also in the district is Blomidon Provincial Park.

Communities within Kings North include:
 Aldershot
 Baxters Harbour
 Billtown
 Blomidon
 Buckleys Corner
 Canada Creek
 Canard
 Canning
 Centreville
 Chipman Brook
 Glenmont
 Habitant
 Halls Harbour
 Town of Kentville
 Kingsport
 Kinsmans Corner
 Lakeville
 The Lookoff
 Lower Canard
 Medford
 Port Williams
 Ross Corner
 Scot's Bay
 Sheffield Mills
 Starr's Point

Members of the Legislative Assembly
Kings North has elected the following Members of the Legislative Assembly:

Election results

1956 general election

1960 general election

1963 general election

1967 general election

1970 general election

1974 general election

1978 general election

1981 general election

1984 general election

1988 general election

1993 general election

1998 general election

1999 general election

2003 general election

2006 general election

2009 general election

2013 general election 

|-

|Progressive Conservative
|John Lohr
|align="right"|2,903
|align="right"|32.49
|align="right"|
|-

|New Democrat
|Jim Morton
|align="right"|2,882
|align="right"|32.26
|align="right"|
|-

|Liberal
|Stephen Wayne Pearl
|align="right"|2,787
|align="right"|31.20
|align="right"|
|-

|}

2017 general election

2021 general election

References 

Elections Nova Scotia, Election Summary From 1867-2007. Retrieved December 14, 2009
Elections Nova Scotia, Complete Results and Statistics (October 6, 1981). Retrieved December 14, 2009
Elections Nova Scotia, Complete Results and Statistics (November 6, 1984). Retrieved December 14, 2009
Elections Nova Scotia, Complete Results and Statistics (September 6, 1988). Retrieved December 14, 2009
Elections Nova Scotia, Complete Results and Statistics (May 25, 1993). Retrieved December 14, 2009
Elections Nova Scotia, Complete Poll By Poll Results - Kings North (March 9, 1998). Retrieved on December 15, 2009
Elections Nova Scotia, Complete Poll By Poll Results - Kings North (July 27, 1999). Retrieved on December 15, 2009
Elections Nova Scotia, Complete Poll By Poll Results - Kings North (August 5, 2003). Retrieved on December 15, 2009
Elections Nova Scotia, Complete Poll By Poll Results - Kings North (June 13, 2006). Retrieved on December 15, 2009
Elections Nova Scotia, Complete Poll By Poll Results - Kings North (June 9, 2009). Retrieved on December 15, 2009

External links
 CBC 2006 District Profile
 District Map
 Elections Nova Scotia description of district
 2009 Map of General Election Results

Nova Scotia provincial electoral districts